WOWF (102.5 FM, "102.5 WOW Country") is a radio station broadcasting a country music format. Licensed to Crossville, Tennessee, United States, the station is currently owned by Peg Broadcasting, LLC and features programming from Dial Global and Fox News Radio.

References

External links
 
 

Country radio stations in the United States
OWF
Cumberland County, Tennessee